Gacheon station is a railway station on the Gyeongbu Line.

Railway stations in Daegu
Railway stations opened in 2005